The Clarksdale Walk of Fame honors notable people from Clarksdale, Mississippi who've made their mark on the culture of Clarksdale. It was created in 2008 by the Clarksdale/Coahoma County Chamber of Commerce as a self-guided walking tour in an effort to increase foot traffic in downtown Clarksdale. The plaques are located near a site of historical significance associated with the honoree. Singer Sam Cooke received the first plaque, dedicated outside the New Roxy theater where he once performed. 

Also in Clarksdale is the Blues Alley Walk of Fame which was a precursor to the Clarksdale Walk of Fame. Blues musician John Lee Hooker and the Texas-based rock band ZZ Top were honored. ZZ Top helped raise $1 million in support of the Delta Blues Museum, they have a plaque at the Carnegie Public Library (former location of the museum).

Inductees

References 

Mississippi culture
Tourist attractions in Coahoma County, Mississippi
Music of Mississippi
2008 establishments in Mississippi